Avalanche is the name of two fictional characters appearing in American comic books published by Marvel Comics. Each character is usually depicted as an enemy of the X-Men.

The Dominikos Petrakis version of Avalanche is a Cretan mutant who possesses the ability to generate seismic waves from his hands that are strong enough to create earthquakes of varying sizes and to disintegrate any substance other than living tissue. He has been a member of the Brotherhood of Mutants and Freedom Force.

The animated series X-Men: Evolution portrays a different version of Avalanche named Lance Alvers, a misguided mutant teenager and romantic love interest of the X-Men's Shadowcat.

Publication history
Created by writer Chris Claremont and artist/co-writer John Byrne, the Dominikos Petrakis version of Avalanche first appeared in The Uncanny X-Men #141 (Jan. 1981).

Fictional character biography

Dominikos Petrakis
Avalanche's story before Mystique recruits him for the second Brotherhood of Evil Mutants is largely a mystery. It is known, however, that he is an immigrant from the Greek island of Crete. There, he lives a quiet life until Mystique invites him to join her new Brotherhood. During his first public appearance with the Brotherhood, the team unsuccessfully attempts to assassinate Senator Robert Kelly during his hearings and testimony on his belief that mutants pose a mortal threat to humanity. The X-Men arrive to stop the assassination and battle the new Brotherhood. After escaping the fray, Avalanche continues his support of Mutant supremacy via terrorist and criminal activities and battling the Avengers with the Brotherhood.

Avalanche briefly leaves the Brotherhood and attempts to blackmail the state of California into paying him an enormous sum to prevent him from using his power to generate an earthquake. Avalanche fights the Hulk alongside Landslide on this occasion and suffers broken arms when he attempts to use his powers against the Hulk. When he returns to the Brotherhood, together they encounter Rom and Hybrid. The team later battles the X-Men as the "Brotherhood of Evil Mutants" one final time.

After that, The Brotherhood's leader Mystique offers the group's services to the United States government. Their first mission under their new name of Freedom Force is to capture the mutant Magneto on behalf of the federal government. The government then sends Freedom Force to capture the Avengers. While seeking to arrest Rusty Collins, he clashed with X-Factor. Freedom Force then fights the X-Men in Dallas and is present at the X-Men's apparent demise, and battles the New Mutants in Dallas as well. Freedom Force then battled Cyclops and Marvel Girl. Freedom Force again tries to arrest Rusty Collins and battled the New Mutants, but are able to arrest Rusty and Skids as well. They are also dispatched to rescue Senator Robert Kelly from a South American drug syndicate that had kidnapped him, battling the syndicate's superhuman agents in the process. Freedom Force also has a costly battle with the Reavers on Muir Island where a number of members are killed or seriously injured. During the Acts of Vengeance, Avalanche teams with Blob and Pyro against the Avengers. Avalanche then joins Freedom Force's effort to stop a prison breakout at the Vault. Avalanche then participates in Freedom Force's final mission in Kuwait. He abandons Blob and Pyro during the battle with Desert Sword to save the seriously injured Crimson Commando.

When Freedom Force is disbanded after the botched mission in the Gulf War, Avalanche continues to work for the government as part of Project: Wideawake, but soon leaves when he finds out that his friend Pyro had contracted the Legacy Virus.

By the time the X-Men establish themselves in San Francisco, Avalanche, going by the alias "Nick", establishes a bar in order to make a living away from crime. When the X-Men moved their headquarters to San Francisco, Petros was frightened that they would eventually come for him for his past crimes. As he was packing in hopes of leaving his new-found life, the X-Men popped in with a friendly warning that they have a truce but will be back if he ever decides to return to a life of crime. As they leave, with his place of business and apartment trashed, Petros looks around, mumbling to himself.

When Norman Osborn starts his war against Mutants in the heart of San Francisco, Gambit sees Avalanche during the riots with Erg and when Ares makes himself known, Avalanche attacks him by causing the earth to rise up under him. Ares then knocks him out by choking him.<ref>X-Men: Legacy #226. Marvel Comics.</ref> He is seen one more time, sitting drunk in his own bar together with other mutants. They are angry that humans are trying to prevent new mutant births and Avalanche participates in the riot. He has the unfortunate circumstance of being paired up against Daken, who easily dodges the worried Avalanche's tremor and was about to slice him. He is taken into custody along with several other mutants who participated in the riots. Eventually Avalanche and the other imprisoned mutants are freed by the X-Force and he becomes a resident of Utopia.

While Utopia and all of San Francisco are trapped in an energy dome created by Bastion, and the mutant race face extermination at the hands of Nimrod Sentinels from the future, Avalanche is among many of Utopia's non-X-Men residents who have now taken up fighting alongside their former rivals. He can be seen fighting alongside the X-Men Sunspot, Husk, and Boom-Boom, defending the passage of the Bart Tunnels. As an "X-Man", Avalanche is also called in by Cyclops during the Fear Itself storyline to help them stop Kurrth. Avalanche uses his powers to create a chasm that Kurrth would not cross, but Kurrth creates a psychic bridge for him and his brainwashed followers to cross anyway.

Avalanche is kidnapped by the Red Skull who removed part of his brain, replacing it with a machine that turned Avalanche into a puppet to attack New York City. As Captain America tries to stop him, he claimed that "the inciting act is complete" and jumped to his apparent death.

Avalanche was among the mutants resurrected and residing on Krakoa.

Unknown
A somehow-repowered Mesmero brainwashed the unknown Avalanche into joining his Brotherhood of Mutants which was secretly funded by anti-mutant activist Lydia Nance. Avalanche's first mission with the Brotherhood of Mutants was to kidnap Mayor Bill de Blaso and held him hostage. The X-Men arrived and defeated the Brotherhood of Mutants who are then arrested by the arriving S.H.I.E.L.D. Agents.

As Lydia Nance still had a use for the Brotherhood of Mutants, she orchestrated Mesmero's escape from the Box. Mesmero once again lured Avalanche and the second Pyro into helping him out again. They were to attack a yacht that was owned by the Heritage Initiative at the time of its fundraiser. They group fought the X-Men alongside the NYPD. The Brotherhood of Mutants managed to get away and fall back to their base. When Mesmero states that the Brotherhood of Mutants are still under Lydia Nance's paycheck, Pyro takes his leave since he didn't want to work for an anti-mutant activist. Avalanche then demanded from Mesmero to get Pyro's cut.

Avalanche then joined another new Brotherhood of Mutants, this time led by Magneto's clone Joseph. During a battle with the X-Men, Avalanche mocked Magik, prompting her to stab him in the heart with her soulsword. It is unknown if he survived this encounter.

Powers and abilities
The Dominikos Petrakis version of Avalanche is a mutant with the superhuman ability to generate powerful seismic waves from his hands, creating highly destructive effects. The waves can cause an inorganic object to shatter or crumble into dust and has in recent years been shown to affect organic matter as well. When directed against large objects like buildings or upon the earth itself, the seismic waves can produce effects similar to those of an earthquake or avalanche within limited areas. Avalanche need not touch an object to affect it; he can direct the waves against it from some distance away. Avalanche himself is immune to the generation of his own vibratory waves. However, if the seismic waves were reflected back at him, he would be injured. Avalanche's power originally had little or no effect on organic tissue, with the reflected vibrations from organic matter ("feedback") injuring him, as when he once tried to attack the Hulk, but lately this has appeared to no longer be the case. As yet there is no known limit to the amount of area upon which Avalanche can use his powers at one time. There is no evidence yet, however, that he could create an earthquake capable of destroying an entire city. Avalanche is a fair hand-to-hand combatant and received unarmed combat training while a member of Freedom Force. Avalanche wears an armored battle suit that gives him enhanced resistance to injury, up to and including protecting him from a land mine. While a member of Freedom Force, he used a two-way radio device for communication with other Freedom Force members.

The unidentified version of Avalanche is also a mutant with the same abilities as the first version except that he can also target organic tissue which the first version was unable to do.

Other versions
Age of Apocalypse
In the Age of Apocalypse, Avalanche was one of the select mutants that were approached by Sinister and offered a chance to join his Elite Mutant Force. Avalanche, however, refused Sinister's offer, for which he was captured at the Breeding Pens. During an escape attempt, Avalanche was killed and his corpse turned over to the Dark Beast for experimentation.

Marvel Zombies
In Marvel Zombies: Dead Days, he is seen as a zombie alongside a zombie version of the Freedom Force fighting the suddenly zombified X-Men.

House of M
In the "House of M" reality, Dominic appears as a member of the NYPD strikeforce known as the Brotherhood.

Old Man Logan
In the original "Old Man Logan" arc on Earth-807128, it was mentioned that Avalanche was the one who blinded Hawkeye during his discussion with Logan. This was seen in the pages of "Old Man Hawkeye" where he vibrated Hawkeye's skull after he killed Baron Zemo.

In the pages of Old Man Logan that took place on Earth-21923, Avalanche was among the villains that attacked the Avengers in Connecticut. After Giant-Man killed Crossbones and Vulture, Avalanche used his powers to open up a hole in the ground and Moloids started crawling over Giant-Man enough for him to fall to the ground.

In other media
Television
 The Dominikos Petrakis incarnation of Avalanche appears in X-Men: The Animated Series, voiced by Rod Coneybeare. This version is a member of the Brotherhood of Evil Mutants.
 An original incarnation of Avalanche named Lance Alvers appears in X-Men: Evolution, voiced by Christopher Grey. This version is a teenage thug and high schooler who leads the Brotherhood of Bayville whenever Mystique or Magneto is not around. Initially aggressive, Alvers slowly matures over the course of the series. Additionally, he displays a rivalry with Scott Summers throughout and initially antagonizes Kitty Pryde during season one before developing mutual romantic feelings for and dating her during the second season, which leads to him briefly leaving the Brotherhood to maintain their relationship. While they break up in the third season, they eventually rekindle their relationship by the series finale, with Alvers and the other Brotherhood members going on to join S.H.I.E.L.D. in a vision of the future that Professor X has.
 The Dominikos Petrakis incarnation of Avalanche appears in Wolverine and the X-Men, voiced by James Patrick Stuart. This version is a member of the Brotherhood of Mutants who speaks with a strong Greek accent and sports a goatee.

Video games
 The Dominikos Petrakis incarnation of Avalanche appears as a boss in X-Men Legends, voiced by Peter Lurie. This version is a member of the Brotherhood of Mutants.
 The Dominikos Petrakis incarnation of Avalanche appears as a boss, later unlockable character, in Marvel: Avengers Alliance''.

Merchandise
Dominic Petros / Avalanche received a figure was released in the "X-Men Classics" toy line.

References

External links
 Avalanche at Marvel Wiki

Characters created by Chris Claremont
Characters created by John Byrne (comics)
Comics characters introduced in 1981
Fictional characters with earth or stone abilities
Fictional Greek people
Fictional secret agents and spies
Marvel Comics martial artists
Marvel Comics mutants
Marvel Comics supervillains
X-Men supporting characters